The United Nations Office of Counter-Terrorism (UNOCT) was approved in a resolution on 15 June 2017, with the consensus of the 193-nation UN General Assembly. The creation of the office was also welcomed by Secretary-General of the United Nations António Guterres' initiative to transfer relevant functions out of the United Nations Department of Political Affairs (DPA), including the Counter-Terrorism Implementation Task Force and the United Nations Counter-Terrorism Centre (UNCCT), to the new United Nations Office of Counter-Terrorism.

According to the Spokesperson for the United Nations Secretary-General Stéphane Dujarric, the Secretary-General welcomed the adoption of the General Assembly resolution "which endorsed his proposal to establish a new UN Office of Counter-Terrorism."
"The Secretary-General considers counter-terrorism and prevention of violent extremism to be one of the highest priorities of the United Nations to address a growing threat to international peace and security," Dujarric said.
"He therefore hopes that this reform of the UN Counter-Terrorism architecture will contribute to the UN's broader efforts to promote conflict prevention, sustainable peace and development”, he added.

Structure
Vladimir Ivanovich Voronkov was appointed Under-Secretary-General of the United Nations Office of Counter-Terrorism on 21 June 2017.

See also
 Counter-Terrorism
 Secretary-General of the United Nations
 UN General Assembly
 United Nations Security Council

References

United Nations General Assembly
Counterterrorism